The Cook Islands national badminton team represents Cook Islands, a self-governing island country in the South Pacific Ocean in free association with New Zealand, in international badminton team competitions. The Cook Islands team will debut in the 2023 Oceania Badminton Championships mixed team event.

Participation in Oceania Badminton Championships

Mixed team

Current squad 
The following players were selected to represent Cook Islands at the 2023 Oceania Badminton Championships.

Male players
Daniel Akavi
Emanuela Mataio
Damus Matakino
David Piakura
Tahitoa Webb

Female players
Tereapii Akavi
Tehani Matapo
Tuaanaore Mitchell
Te Pa O Te Rangi Tupa

References

National badminton teams